Doncaster Collegiate Sixth Form "DC6" is a sixth form centre with academy status located in Doncaster, South Yorkshire, England.

History
DC6 was founded after combining 5 Sixth forms from across the Doncaster and Bassetlaw area.

Campuses
DC6 has 5 campuses

 Doncaster North:    Don Valley Academy
 Doncaster South:    Rossington All Saints Academy
 Doncaster East:     Ash Hill Academy
 Doncaster West:     De Warenne Academy
 Bassetlaw:          Serlby Park Academy

Courses
DC6 offers a wide range of courses at Level 1, 2 and 3.

A Level
Over 25 different A Level subjects are available and can be taken in a number of combinations

Technical Levels
15 different Applied and Technical Level subjects are on offer and can be studied alone or in combination with A Levels

Pre-Apprenticeships
In partnership with Employers and Apprenticeship providers, C6 offers Pre-Apprenticeship programmes in 10 vocational sectors.

Academic performance
 DFE

References

External links

Academies in Doncaster
Education in Doncaster
Delta schools
2010 establishments in England
Educational institutions established in 2010